Ferdinand Leigh Claiborne (March 9, 1772 - March 22, 1815) was an American military officer most notable for his command of the militia of the Mississippi Territory during the Creek War and the War of 1812.

Early life
Born in Sussex County, Virginia, Ferdinand was the brother of William C. C. Claiborne and father of John Francis Hamtramck Claiborne. He was a descendant of Colonel William Claiborne (1600–1677), who was born in Crayford, Kent, England and settled in the Colony of Virginia.

He began his military service when appointed an ensign in 1793 in the 1st Sub-Legion.  Promoted to lieutenant in 1794, Claiborne fought at the Battle of Fallen Timbers, under the command of General Anthony Wayne.  With the end of the Northwest Indian War, Claiborne served as a recruiter in Richmond and Norfolk, before returning to the Northwest Territory to serve as acting adjutant-general.  Promoted to Captain in 1799, Claiborne resigned his commission on 1 January 1802 and moved to Natchez, Mississippi.

Mississippi Territory
At the time of his move to Natchez, Claiborne's brother William C. C. Claiborne was serving as governor and superintendent of Indian affairs for the Mississippi Territory.  Elected in 1804 to serve in the 3rd General Assembly of the Mississippi Territory, Claiborne experienced a rapid rise in prominence.  Appointed colonel of the Militia of Adams County, in 1806 Claiborne was ordered to march a unit in support of General James Wilkinson during the Sabine expedition.  A political dispute between Claiborne and Governor Williams led to the revocations of his commissions as militia colonel and magistrate.

War of 1812 and Creek War
A change of territorial administrations led to Governor Holmes asking the President of the United States to commission Claiborne as a Brigadier General of the militia of the territory.  Supported by the legislature in 1809, this appointment was made in 1811.  When war was declared in 1812 Claiborne was made a colonel of Mississippi Volunteers, United States Volunteers.  Promoted to brigadier general of volunteers in March 1813, he became the force's commander.

Creek War
United States military involvement in the Creek War began on 27 July 1813.  A unit of Mississippi Territory militia intercepted and engaged a group of Red Stick Creeks.  This engagement, known as the Battle of Burnt Corn raised tensions considerably within the territory.

In July 1813, Claiborne was ordered to Fort Stoddert to defend the eastern part of Mississippi Territory from the Creeks.  Claiborne expected the Creek to seek revenge for the previous battle.  Knowing that he did not have the resources for a full-scale offensive against the Creek, he instead dispatched troops to reinforce various frontier forts, including Fort St. Stephens and Fort Glass.  Claiborne assigned Major Daniel Beasley to take less than 200 militiamen to reinforce forts along the Tensaw River.  Beasley distributed about 50 of his troops to various forts along the river and stationed the remaining 120 at Fort Mims.  This decision turned out to be a fateful one as Beasley, his troops, and many of the settlers and mixed race Creek sheltering in the fort were killed during the Massacre of Fort Mims on 30 August 1813.  Claiborne was initially blamed for the massacre.  However, Beasley took few precautions despite the likelihood of an attack.  The day before the attack Beasley disregarded the sighting of Creek warriors by two slaves, after cursory scouting did not find any Creeks.

When news of the massacre reached Claiborne, his command was still in no position to further reinforce the frontier.  Brigadier General Thomas Flournoy, commander of the Seventh Military District, based in New Orleans, authorized Claiborne to call up more militia to augment his force.  He was ordered to march his newly augmented force to the confluence of the Alabama and Tombigbee Rivers engaging any Creek forces encountered. Claiborne spent approximately one month at Fort Easley combing the area for Red Stick warriors. Claiborne then established Fort Claiborne as his base of operations against the Creeks.  With the completion of the fort, Claiborne was to be reinforced by army regulars from the 3rd Infantry Regiment and 7th Infantry Regiment.

Claiborne's expected reinforcements were delayed when an administrative change of responsibilities for the Creek campaign occurred.  The conflict was taking place in both the Sixth Military District and the Seventh Military District.  The decision was made to place the conflict under the command of the Sixth Military District.  Taking offense, Flournoy, the Seventh District commander called his regulars back to New Orleans and dismissed from federal service the Mississippi Dragoon Regiment.  Claiborne's initial protest was met by a reprimand from Flournoy, but Claiborne's persistence led to the Third Infantry joining the campaign.

With the addition of the regulars, Claiborne began his campaign in November 1813 with a combined force of 1200 troops.  The campaign's objective was the Creek settlement at Econochaca.  Also known as the Holy Ground, this settlement served as a safe haven and base of operations for William Weatherford.  Creek prophets claimed to have placed a protective barrier around the town to kill any white man who crossed the barrier.  As Claiborne marched on Econochaca, he established forts to protect the rear of his force.  On 23 December 1813, Claiborne attacked Econachca.  The ensuing Battle of Holy Ground marked a defeat for the Creeks.  After Claiborne's force foraged for food, they burned the rest of the town.  The following day Claiborne's force fought another brief engagement and burned another Creek town.

Aftermath and effect on the wider war
With the Red Sticks on the run and pushed out of his area of operations Claiborne retired to Fort Claiborne.  His militia troops' enlistments were due to expire on 1 January 1814.  Claiborne resigned his volunteer commission on 17 January 1814.  Claiborne's campaign had a significant impact on the Creek War.  By clearing the Alabama River of Red Sticks, and building fortification to keep them out, he forced them to move eastward.  This eastward movement nearly coincided with the beginning of the campaign of General Andrew Jackson.  This set the stage for the Battle of Horseshoe Bend, which occurred on 27 March 1814, a decisive victory for Jackson, effectively ending the Red Stick resistance.

Last years and death
Claiborne returned to Natchez with his troops in 1814.  In March of that year, he resumed his duties as brigadier general of militia.  Claiborne made extensive expenditures, of his own money, for the care and transportation of his men.  In doing so, he expended nearly all of his fortune.  Claiborne died March 22, 1815 [7]  at the age of 45.

References

1773 births
1815 deaths
People from Sussex County, Virginia
Claiborne family
American people of English descent
United States Army generals
American militia generals
United States Army personnel of the War of 1812
People of the Creek War